This list contains a list of EC numbers for the second group, EC 2, transferases, placed in numerical order as determined by the Nomenclature Committee of the International Union of Biochemistry and Molecular Biology.  All official information is tabulated at the website of the committee. The database is developed and maintained by Andrew McDonald.

EC 2.1: Transferring One-Carbon Groups

EC 2.1.1: Methyltransferases
 : nicotinamide N-methyltransferase
 : guanidinoacetate N-methyltransferase
 : thetin—homocysteine S-methyltransferase
 : acetylserotonin O-methyltransferase
 : betaine—homocysteine S-methyltransferase
 : catechol O-methyltransferase
 : nicotinate N-methyltransferase
 : histamine N-methyltransferase
 : thiol S-methyltransferase
 : homocysteine S-methyltransferase
 : magnesium protoporphyrin IX methyltransferase
 : methionine S-methyltransferase
 : methionine synthase
 : 5-methyltetrahydropteroyltriglutamate—homocysteine S-methyltransferase
 : fatty-acid O-methyltransferase
 : methylene-fatty-acyl-phospholipid synthase
 : phosphatidylethanolamine N-methyltransferase
 : polysaccharide O-methyltransferase
 : trimethylsulfonium—tetrahydrofolate N-methyltransferase
 : glycine N-methyltransferase
 : methylamine—glutamate N-methyltransferase
 : carnosine N-methyltransferase
 EC 2.1.1.23: now covered by EC 2.1.1.124, EC 2.1.1.125 and EC 2.1.1.126
 EC 2.1.1.24: now covered by EC 2.1.1.77, EC 2.1.1.80 and EC 2.1.1.100
 : phenol O-methyltransferase
 : iodophenol O-methyltransferase
 : tyramine N-methyltransferase
 : phenylethanolamine N-methyltransferase
 EC 2.1.1.29: Now covered by EC 2.1.1.202, EC 2.1.1.203 and EC 2.1.1.204
 EC 2.1.1.30: tRNA (purine-2- or -6-)-methyltransferase: Reactions previously described are due to EC 2.1.1.32 
 EC 2.1.1.31: Now covered by EC 2.1.1.221 and EC 2.1.1.228
 EC 2.1.1.32: Now covered by EC 2.1.1.213, EC 2.1.1.214, EC 2.1.1.215 and EC 2.1.1.216
 : tRNA (guanine46-N7)-methyltransferase
 : tRNA (guanosine18-2′-O)-methyltransferase
 : tRNA (uracil54-C5)-methyltransferase
 EC 2.1.1.36: Now covered by EC 2.1.1.217, EC 2.1.1.218, EC 2.1.1.219, EC 2.1.1.220
 : DNA (cytosine-5-)-methyltransferase
 : O-demethylpuromycin O-methyltransferase
 : inositol 3-methyltransferase
 : inositol 1-methyltransferase
 : sterol 24-C-methyltransferase
 : flavone 3′-O-methyltransferase
 EC 2.1.1.43: Now described by EC 2.1.1.354, EC 2.1.1.355,  EC 2.1.1.356, EC 2.1.1.357,  EC 2.1.1.358, EC 2.1.1.359, EC 2.1.1.360, EC 2.1.1.361 and EC 2.1.1.362
 : L-histidine Nα-methyltransferase
 : thymidylate synthase
 : isoflavone 4′-O-methyltransferase
 : indolepyruvate C-methyltransferase
 EC 2.1.1.48: Now covered by EC 2.1.1.181, EC 2.1.1.182, EC 2.1.1.183 and EC 2.1.1.184
 : amine N-methyltransferase
 : loganate O-methyltransferase
 EC 2.1.1.51: Now covered by EC 2.1.1.187 and EC 2.1.1.188
 EC 2.1.1.52:  Now covered by EC 2.1.1.171, EC 2.1.1.172, EC 2.1.1.173 and EC 2.1.1.174
 : putrescine N-methyltransferase
 : deoxycytidylate C-methyltransferase
 : tRNA (adenine-N6-)-methyltransferase
 : mRNA (guanine-N7)-methyltransferase
 : methyltransferase cap1
 : deleted, included in EC 2.1.1.57
 : [cytochrome c]-lysine N-methyltransferase|[cytochrome c]-lysine N-methyltransferase
 : calmodulin-lysine N-methyltransferase
 : tRNA (5-methylaminomethyl-2-thiouridylate)-methyltransferase
 : mRNA (2′-O-methyladenosine-N6-)-methyltransferase
 : methylated-DNA—[protein]-cysteine S-methyltransferase
 : 3-demethylubiquinol 3-O-methyltransferase
 : licodione 2′-O-methyltransferase
 EC 2.1.1.66: Now covered by EC 2.1.1.230
 : thiopurine S-methyltransferase
 : caffeate O-methyltransferase
 : 5-hydroxyfuranocoumarin 5-O-methyltransferase
 : 8-hydroxyfuranocoumarin 8-O-methyltransferase
 : phosphatidyl-N-methylethanolamine N-methyltransferase
 : site-specific DNA-methyltransferase (adenine-specific)
 EC 2.1.1.73: deleted: reaction is that of EC 2.1.1.37, DNA (cytosine-5-)-methyltransferase
 : methylenetetrahydrofolate—tRNA-(uracil54-C5)-methyltransferase [NAD(P)H-oxidizing]
 : apigenin 4′-O-methyltransferase
 : quercetin 3-O-methyltransferase
 : protein-L-isoaspartate(D-aspartate) O-methyltransferase
 : isoorientin 3′-O-methyltransferase
 : cyclopropane-fatty-acyl-phospholipid synthase
 : protein-glutamate O-methyltransferase
 EC 2.1.1.81: deleted, included in EC 2.1.1.49
 : 3-methylquercetin 7-O-methyltransferase
 : 3,7-dimethylquercetin 4′-O-methyltransferase
 : methylquercetagetin 6-O-methyltransferase
 : protein-histidine N-methyltransferase
 : tetrahydromethanopterin S-methyltransferase
 : pyridine N-methyltransferase
 : 8-hydroxyquercetin 8-O-methyltransferase
 : tetrahydrocolumbamine 2-O-methyltransferase
 : methanol—5-hydroxybenzimidazolylcobamide Co-methyltransferase
 : isobutyraldoxime O-methyltransferase
 EC 2.1.1.92: Now included with EC 2.1.1.69
 EC 2.1.1.93: is identical to EC 2.1.1.70, 8-hydroxyfuranocoumarin 8-O-methyltransferase
 : tabersonine 16-O-methyltransferase
 : tocopherol C-methyltransferase
 : thioether S-methyltransferase
 : 3-hydroxyanthranilate 4-C-methyltransferase
 : diphthine synthase
 : 3-hydroxy-16-methoxy-2,3-dihydrotabersonine N-methyltransferase
 : protein-S-isoprenylcysteine O-methyltransferase
 : macrocin O-methyltransferase
 : demethylmacrocin O-methyltransferase
 : phosphoethanolamine N-methyltransferase
 : caffeoyl-CoA O-methyltransferase
 : N-benzoyl-4-hydroxyanthranilate 4-O-methyltransferase
 : tryptophan 2-C-methyltransferase
 : uroporphyrinogen-III C-methyltransferase
 : 6-hydroxymellein O-methyltransferase
 : demethylsterigmatocystin 6-O-methyltransferase
 : sterigmatocystin 8-O-methyltransferase
 : anthranilate N-methyltransferase
 : glucuronoxylan 4-O-methyltransferase
 : site-specific DNA-methyltransferase (cytosine-N4-specific)
 : polyprenyldihydroxybenzoate methyltransferase
 : (RS)-1-benzyl-1,2,3,4-tetrahydroisoquinoline N-methyltransferase
 : 3′-hydroxy-N-methyl-(S)-coclaurine 4′-O-methyltransferase
 : (S)-scoulerine 9-O-methyltransferase
 : columbamine O-methyltransferase
 : 10-hydroxydihydrosanguinarine 10-O-methyltransferase
 : 12-hydroxydihydrochelirubine 12-O-methyltransferase
 : 6-O-methylnorlaudanosoline 5′-O-methyltransferase
 : (S)-tetrahydroprotoberberine N-methyltransferase
 : [cytochrome-c]-methionine S-methyltransferase
 EC 2.1.1.124: Now covered by EC 2.1.1.319, EC 2.1.1.320, EC 2.1.1.321 and EC 2.1.1.322
 EC 2.1.1.125: Now covered by EC 2.1.1.319, EC 2.1.1.320, EC 2.1.1.321
 EC 2.1.1.126: Now covered by EC 2.1.1.319, EC 2.1.1.320, EC 2.1.1.321
 : [ribulose-bisphosphate carboxylase]-lysine N-methyltransferase
 : (RS)-norcoclaurine 6-O-methyltransferase
 : inositol 4-methyltransferase
 : precorrin-2 C20-methyltransferase
 : precorrin-2 C17-methyltransferase
 : precorrin-6B C5,15-methyltransferase (decarboxylating)
 : precorrin-4 C11-methyltransferase
 EC 2.1.1.134: now with EC 2.1.1.129
 EC 2.1.1.135: now EC 1.16.1.8
 : chlorophenol O-methyltransferase
 : arsenite methyltransferase
 EC 2.1.1.138: deleted: Reaction due to EC 2.1.1.137
 : 3′-demethylstaurosporine O-methyltransferase
 : (S)-coclaurine-N-methyltransferase
 : jasmonate O-methyltransferase
 : cycloartenol 24-C-methyltransferase
 : 24-methylenesterol C-methyltransferase
 : trans-aconitate 2-methyltransferase
 : trans-aconitate 3-methyltransferase
 : (iso)eugenol O-methyltransferase
 : corydaline synthase
 : thymidylate synthase (FAD)
 EC 2.1.1.149:  Now covered by EC 2.1.1.267, flavonoid 3′,5′-methyltransferase
 : isoflavone 7-O-methyltransferase
 : cobalt-factor II C20-methyltransferase
 : precorrin-6A synthase (deacetylating)
 : vitexin 2′′-O-rhamnoside 7-O-methyltransferase
 : isoliquiritigenin 2′-O-methyltransferase
 : kaempferol 4′-O-methyltransferase
 : glycine/sarcosine N-methyltransferase
 : sarcosine/dimethylglycine N-methyltransferase
 : 7-methylxanthosine synthase
 : theobromine synthase
 : caffeine synthase
 : dimethylglycine N-methyltransferase
 : glycine/sarcosine/dimethylglycine N-methyltransferase
 : demethylmenaquinone methyltransferase
 : demethylrebeccamycin-D-glucose O-methyltransferase
 : methyl halide transferase
 : 23S rRNA (uridine2552-2′-O)-methyltransferase
 : 27S pre-rRNA (guanosine2922-2′-O)-methyltransferase
 : 21S rRNA (uridine2791-2′-O)-methyltransferase
 : tricetin 3′,4′,5′-O-trimethyltransferase
 : 16S rRNA (guanine527-N7)-methyltransferase
 : 16S rRNA (guanine966-N2)-methyltransferase
 : 16S rRNA (guanine1207-N2))-methyltransferase
 : 23S rRNA (guanine2445-N2)-methyltransferase
 : 23S rRNA (guanine1835-N2)-methyltransferase
 : tricin synthase
 : 16S rRNA (cytosine967-C5)-methyltransferase
 : 23S rRNA (pseudouridine1915-N3)-methyltransferase
 : 16S rRNA (cytosine1407-C5)-methyltransferase
 : 16S rRNA (guanine1405-N7)-methyltransferase
 : 16S rRNA (adenine1408-N1)-methyltransferase
 : 23S rRNA (adenine1618-N6)-methyltransferase
 : 16S rRNA (adenine1518-N6/adenineadenine1519-N6)-dimethyltransferase
 : 18S rRNA (adenine1779-N6/adenine1780-N6)-dimethyltransferase
 : 23S rRNA (adenine2085-N6)-dimethyltransferase
 : 23S rRNA (guanosine2251-2′-O)-methyltransferase
 : 23S rRNA (cytidine2498-2′-O)-methyltransferase
 : 23S rRNA (guanine745-N1)-methyltransferase
 : 23S rRNA (guanine748-N1)-methyltransferase
 : 23S rRNA (uracil747-C5)-methyltransferase
 : 23S rRNA (uracil1939-C5)-methyltransferase
 : 23S rRNA (cytosine1962-C5)-methyltransferase
 : 23S rRNA (adenine2503-C2)-methyltransferase
 : 16S rRNA (uracil1498-N3)-methyltransferase
 EC 2.1.1.194:  A mixture of EC 2.1.1.192 and EC 2.1.1.224 
 : cobalt-precorrin-5B (C1)-methyltransferase
 : cobalt-precorrin-7 (C15)-methyltransferase (decarboxylating)
 : malonyl-[acyl-carrier protein] O-methyltransferase
 : 16S rRNA (cytidine1402-2′-O)-methyltransferase
 : 16S rRNA (cytosine1402-N4)-methyltransferase
 : tRNA (cytidine32/uridine32-2′-O)-methyltransferase
 : 2-methoxy-6-polyprenyl-1,4-benzoquinol methylase
 : multisite-specific tRNA:(cytosine-C5)-methyltransferase
 : tRNA (cytosine34-C5)-methyltransferase
 : tRNA (cytosine38-C5)-methyltransferase
 : tRNA (cytidine32/guanosine34-2′-O)-methyltransferase
 : tRNA (cytidine56-2′-O)-methyltransferase
 : tRNA (cytidine34-2′-O)-methyltransferase
 : 23S rRNA (uridine2479-2′-O)-methyltransferase
 : 23S rRNA (guanine2535-N1)-methyltransferase
 : demethylspheroidene O-methyltransferase
 : tRNASer(uridine44-2′-O)-methyltransferase
 : 2,7,4′-trihydroxyisoflavanone 4′-O-methyltransferase
 : tRNA (guanine110-N2)-dimethyltransferase
 : tRNA (guanine10-N2)-methyltransferase
 : tRNA (guanine26-N2/guanine27-N2)-dimethyltransferase
 : tRNA (guanine26-N2)-dimethyltransferase
 : tRNA (adenine22-N1)-methyltransferase
 : tRNA (adenine9-N1)-methyltransferase
 : tRNA (adenine57-N1/adenine58-N1)-methyltransferase
 : tRNA (adenine58-N1)-methyltransferase
 : tRNA (guanine9-N1)-methyltransferase
 : 2-polyprenyl-6-hydroxyphenyl methylase
 : tRNA1Val (adenine937-N6)-methyltransferase
 : 23S rRNA (adenine2503-C8)-methyltransferase
 : tRNA:m4X modification enzyme
 : 23S rRNA (cytidine1920-2′-O)-methyltransferase
 : 16S rRNA (cytidine1409-2′-O)-methyltransferase
 : tRNA (guanine37-N1)-methyltransferase
 : tRNA (carboxymethyluridine34-5-O)-methyltransferase
 : 23S rRNA (adenosine1067-2′-O)-methyltransferase
 : flavonoid 4′-O-methyltransferase
 : naringenin 7-O-methyltransferase
 : [phosphatase 2A protein]-leucine-carboxy methyltransferase
 : dTDP-3-amino-3,4,6-trideoxy-α-D-glucopyranose N,N-dimethyltransferase
 : dTDP-3-amino-3,6-dideoxy-α-D-glucopyranose N,N-dimethyltransferase
 : dTDP-3-amino-3,6-dideoxy-α-D-galactopyranose N,N-dimethyltransferase
 : [[mycinamicin III 3-O-methyltransferase|mycinamicin III 3′′-O-methyltransferase]]
 : erythromycin 3′′-O-methyltransferase
 : geranyl diphosphate 2-C-methyltransferase
 : tRNA (guanine6-N6-methyltransferase)
 : tRNA (pseudouridine54-N1)-methyltransferase
 : 5-methyltetrahydrofolate—corrinoid/iron-sulfur protein Co-methyltransferase
 : [fructose-bisphosphate aldolase]-lysine N-methyltransferase
 : rRNA small subunit pseudouridine methyltransferase Nep1
 : 4-dimethylallyltryptophan N-methyltransferase
 : squalene methyltransferase
 : botryococcene C-methyltransferase
 : 23S rRNA (guanine2069-N7)-methyltransferase
 : tellurite methyltransferase

Most of the remaining entries have no Wikipedia articles

 EC 2.1.1.266: 23S rRNA (adenine2030-N6)-methyltransferase	 
 EC 2.1.1.267: flavonoid 3′,5′-methyltransferase	 
 EC 2.1.1.268: tRNAThr (cytosine32-N3)-methyltransferase	 
 EC 2.1.1.269: dimethylsulfoniopropionate demethylase	 
 EC 2.1.1.270: (+)-6a-hydroxymaackiain 3-O-methyltransferase	 
 EC 2.1.1.271: cobalt-precorrin-4 methyltransferase	 
 EC 2.1.1.272: cobalt-factor III methyltransferase	 
 EC 2.1.1.273: benzoate O-methyltransferase	 
 EC 2.1.1.274: salicylate 1-O-methyltransferase	 
 EC 2.1.1.275: gibberellin A9 O-methyltransferase	 
 EC 2.1.1.276: gibberellin A4 carboxyl methyltransferase	 
 EC 2.1.1.277: anthranilate O-methyltransferase	 
 EC 2.1.1.278: indole-3-acetate O-methyltransferase	 
 EC 2.1.1.279: trans-anol O-methyltransferase	 
 EC 2.1.1.280: selenocysteine Se-methyltransferase	 
 EC 2.1.1.281: phenylpyruvate C3-methyltransferase	 
 EC 2.1.1.282: tRNAPhe 7-[(3-amino-3-carboxypropyl)-4-demethylwyosine37-N4]-methyltransferase	 
 EC 2.1.1.283: emodin O-methyltransferase	 
 EC 2.1.1.284: 8-demethylnovobiocic acid C8-methyltransferase	 
 EC 2.1.1.285: demethyldecarbamoylnovobiocin O-methyltransferase	 
 EC 2.1.1.286: 25S rRNA (adenine2142-N1)-methyltransferase	 
 EC 2.1.1.287: 25S rRNA (adenine645-N1)-methyltransferase	 
 EC 2.1.1.288: aklanonic acid methyltransferase	 
 EC 2.1.1.289: cobalt-precorrin-7 (C5)-methyltransferase	 
 EC 2.1.1.290: tRNAPhe [7-(3-amino-3-carboxypropyl)wyosine37-O]-methyltransferase	 
 EC 2.1.1.291: (R,S)-reticuline 7-O-methyltransferase	 
 EC 2.1.1.292: carminomycin 4-O-methyltransferase	 
 EC 2.1.1.293: 6-hydroxytryprostatin B O-methyltransferase	 
 EC 2.1.1.294: 3-O-phospho-polymannosyl GlcNAc-diphospho-ditrans,octacis-undecaprenol 3-phospho-methyltransferase	 
 EC 2.1.1.295: 2-methyl-6-phytyl-1,4-hydroquinone methyltransferase	 
 EC 2.1.1.296: methyltransferase cap2	 
 EC 2.1.1.297: peptide chain release factor N5-glutamine methyltransferase	 
 EC 2.1.1.298: ribosomal protein L3 N5-glutamine methyltransferase	 
 EC 2.1.1.299: protein N-terminal monomethyltransferase	 
 EC 2.1.1.300: pavine N-methyltransferase	 
 EC 2.1.1.301: cypemycin N-terminal methyltransferase	 
 EC 2.1.1.302: 3-hydroxy-5-methyl-1-naphthoate 3-O-methyltransferase	 
 EC 2.1.1.303: 2,7-dihydroxy-5-methyl-1-naphthoate 7-O-methyltransferase	 
 EC 2.1.1.304: L-tyrosine C3-methyltransferase	 
 EC 2.1.1.305: 8-demethyl-8-α-L-rhamnosyltetracenomycin-C 2′-O-methyltransferase	 
 EC 2.1.1.306: 8-demethyl-8-(2-methoxy-α-L-rhamnosyl)tetracenomycin-C 3′-O-methyltransferase	 
 EC 2.1.1.307: 8-demethyl-8-(2,3-dimethoxy-α-L-rhamnosyl)tetracenomycin-C 4′-O-methyltransferase	 
 EC 2.1.1.308: cytidylyl-2-hydroxyethylphosphonate methyltransferase	 
 EC 2.1.1.309: 18S rRNA (guanine1575-N7)-methyltransferase	 
 EC 2.1.1.310: 25S rRNA (cytosine2870-C5)-methyltransferase	 
 EC 2.1.1.311: 25S rRNA (cytosine2278-C5)-methyltransferase	 
 EC 2.1.1.312: 25S rRNA (uracil2843-N3)-methyltransferase	 
 EC 2.1.1.313: 25S rRNA (uracil2634-N3)-methyltransferase	 
 EC 2.1.1.314: diphthine methyl ester synthase	 
 EC 2.1.1.315: 27-O-demethylrifamycin SV methyltransferase	 
 EC 2.1.1.316: mitomycin 6-O-methyltransferase	 
 EC 2.1.1.317: sphingolipid C9-methyltransferase	 
 EC 2.1.1.318: [trehalose-6-phosphate synthase]-L-cysteine S-methyltransferase	 
 EC 2.1.1.319: type I protein arginine methyltransferase	 
 EC 2.1.1.320: type II protein arginine methyltransferase	 
 EC 2.1.1.321: type III protein arginine methyltransferase	 
 EC 2.1.1.322: type IV protein arginine methyltransferase	 
 EC 2.1.1.323: (–)-pluviatolide 4-O-methyltransferase	 
 EC 2.1.1.324: dTDP-4-amino-2,3,4,6-tetradeoxy-D-glucose N,N-dimethyltransferase	 
 EC 2.1.1.325: juvenile hormone-III synthase	 
 EC 2.1.1.326: N-acetyldemethylphosphinothricin P-methyltransferase	 
 EC 2.1.1.327: phenazine-1-carboxylate N-methyltransferase	 
 EC 2.1.1.328: N-demethylindolmycin N-methyltransferase	 
 EC 2.1.1.329: demethylphylloquinol methyltransferase	 
 EC 2.1.1.330: 5′-demethylyatein 5′-O-methyltransferase	 
 EC 2.1.1.331: bacteriochlorophyllide d C-121-methyltransferase	 
 EC 2.1.1.332: bacteriochlorophyllide d C-82-methyltransferase	 
 EC 2.1.1.333: bacteriochlorophyllide d C-20 methyltransferase	 
 EC 2.1.1.334: methanethiol S-methyltransferase	 
 EC 2.1.1.335: 4-amino-anhydrotetracycline N4-methyltransferase	 
 EC 2.1.1.336: norbelladine O-methyltransferase	 
 EC 2.1.1.337: reticuline N-methyltransferase	 
 EC 2.1.1.338: desmethylxanthohumol 6′-O-methyltransferase	 
 EC 2.1.1.339: xanthohumol 4-O-methyltransferase	 
 EC 2.1.1.340: 3-aminomethylindole N'-methyltransferase	 
 EC 2.1.1.341: vanillate/3-O-methylgallate O-demethylase	 
 EC 2.1.1.342: anaerobilin synthase	 
 EC 2.1.1.343: 8-amino-8-demethylriboflavin N,N-dimethyltransferase	 
 EC 2.1.1.344: ornithine lipid N-methyltransferase	 
 EC 2.1.1.345: psilocybin synthase	 
 EC 2.1.1.346: U6 snRNA m6A methyltransferase	 
 EC 2.1.1.347: (+)-O-methylkolavelool synthase	 
 EC 2.1.1.348: mRNA m6A methyltransferase	 
 EC 2.1.1.349: toxoflavin synthase	 
 EC 2.1.1.350: menaquinone C8-methyltransferase	 
 EC 2.1.1.351: nocamycin O-methyltransferase	 
 EC 2.1.1.352: 3-O-acetyl-4′-O-demethylpapaveroxine 4′-O-methyltransferase	 
 EC 2.1.1.353: demethylluteothin O-methyltransferase	 
 EC 2.1.1.354: [histone H3]-lysine4 N-trimethyltransferase	 
 EC 2.1.1.355: [histone H3]-lysine9 N-trimethyltransferase	 
 EC 2.1.1.356: [histone H3]-lysine27 N-trimethyltransferase	 
 EC 2.1.1.357: [histone H3]-lysine36 N-dimethyltransferase	 
 EC 2.1.1.358: [histone H3]-dimethyl-L-lysine36 N-methyltransferase. Now known to have the activity of 2.1.1.359, [histone H3]-lysine36 N-trimethyltransferase.	 
 EC 2.1.1.359: [histone H3]-lysine36 N-trimethyltransferase	 
 EC 2.1.1.360: [histone H3]-lysine79 N-trimethyltransferase	 
 EC 2.1.1.361: [histone H4]-lysine20 N-methyltransferase	 
 EC 2.1.1.362: [histone H4]-N-methyl-L-lysine20 N-methyltransferase	 
 EC 2.1.1.363: pre-sodorifen synthase	 
 EC 2.1.1.364: [histone H3]-lysine4 N-methyltransferase	 
 EC 2.1.1.365: MMP 1-O-methyltransferase	 
 EC 2.1.1.366: [histone H3]-N6,N6-dimethyl-lysine9 N-methyltransferase	 
 EC 2.1.1.367: [histone H3]-lysine9 N-methyltransferase	 
 EC 2.1.1.368: [histone H3]-lysine9 N-dimethyltransferase	 
 EC 2.1.1.369: [histone H3]-lysine27 N-methyltransferase	 
 EC 2.1.1.370: [histone H3]-lysine4 N-dimethyltransferase	 
 EC 2.1.1.371: [histone H3]-lysine27 N-dimethyltransferase	 
 EC 2.1.1.372: [histone H4]-lysine20 N-trimethyltransferase	 
 EC 2.1.1.373: 2-hydroxy-4-(methylsulfanyl)butanoate S-methyltransferase	 
 EC 2.1.1.374: 2-heptyl-1-hydroxyquinolin-4(1H)-one methyltransferase	 
 EC 2.1.1.375: NNS virus cap methyltransferase	 
 EC 2.1.1.376: glycine betaine—corrinoid protein Co-methyltransferase	 
 EC 2.1.1.377: [methyl-Co(III) glycine betaine-specific corrinoid protein]—coenzyme M methyltransferase	 
 EC 2.1.1.378: [methyl-Co(III) glycine betaine-specific corrinoid protein]—tetrahydrofolate methyltransferase	 
 EC 2.1.1.379: [methyl coenzyme M reductase]-L-arginine C-5-methyltransferase

EC 2.1.2: Hydroxymethyl-, Formyl- and Related Transferases
 : glycine hydroxymethyltransferase
 : phosphoribosylglycinamide formyltransferase 1
 : phosphoribosylaminoimidazolecarboxamide formyltransferase
 : glycine formimidoyltransferase
 : glutamate formiminotransferase
 EC 2.1.2.6: deleted, included in EC 2.1.2.5
 : D-alanine 2-hydroxymethyltransferase
 : deoxycytidylate 5-hydroxymethyltransferase
 : methionyl-tRNA formyltransferase
 : aminomethyltransferase
 : 3-methyl-2-oxobutanoate hydroxymethyltransferase
 EC 2.1.2.12: now EC 2.1.1.74
 : UDP-4-amino-4-deoxy-L-arabinose formyltransferase
 EC 2.1.2.14: GDP-perosamine N-formyltransferase (*)

(*) No Wikipedia article

EC 2.1.3: Carboxy- and Carbamoyltransferases
 : methylmalonyl-CoA carboxytransferase
 : aspartate carbamoyltransferase
 : ornithine carbamoyltransferase
 EC 2.1.3.4: deleted
 : oxamate carbamoyltransferase
 : putrescine carbamoyltransferase
 : 3-hydroxymethylcephem carbamoyltransferase
 : lysine carbamoyltransferase
 : N-acetylornithine carbamoyltransferase
 : malonyl-S-ACP:biotin-protein carboxyltransferase
 : N-succinylornithine carbamoyltransferase
 EC 2.1.3.13: The enzyme has been replaced by EC 6.1.2.2
 EC 2.1.3.14: The enzyme has been replaced by EC 6.1.2.2
 EC 2.1.3.15: acetyl-CoA carboxytransferase (*)
(*) No Wikipedia article

EC 2.1.4: Amidinotransferases
 : glycine amidinotransferase
 : scyllo-inosamine-4-phosphate amidinotransferase
 EC 2.1.4.3: L-arginine:L-lysine amidinotransferase (*)
(*) No Wikipedia article

EC 2.1.5:  Methylenetransferases
 EC 2.1.5.1: sesamin methylene transferase (*)
(*) No Wikipedia article

EC 2.2: Transferring Aldehyde or Ketonic Groups
EC 2.2.1: Transketolases and Transaldolases
 : transketolase
 : transaldolase
 : formaldehyde transketolase
 : acetoin—ribose-5-phosphate transaldolase
 : 2-hydroxy-3-oxoadipate synthase
 : acetolactate synthase
 : 1-deoxy-D-xylulose-5-phosphate synthase
 : fluorothreonine transaldolase
 : 2-succinyl-5-enolpyruvyl-6-hydroxy-3-cyclohexene-1-carboxylic-acid synthase
 : 2-amino-3,7-dideoxy-D-threo-hept-6-ulosonate synthase
 : 6-deoxy-5-ketofructose 1-phosphate synthase
 EC 2.2.1.12: 3-acetyloctanal synthase (*)	
 EC 2.2.1.13: apulose-4-phosphate transketolase (*) 
 EC 2.2.1.14: 6-deoxy-6-sulfo-D-fructose transaldolase (*)
(*) No Wikipedia article

EC 2.3: Acyltransferases
EC 2.3.1: Transferring groups other than amino-acyl groups
 : amino-acid N-acetyltransferase
 : imidazole N-acetyltransferase
 : glucosamine N-acetyltransferase
 : glucosamine-phosphate N-acetyltransferase
 : arylamine N-acetyltransferase
 : choline O-acetyltransferase
 : carnitine O-acetyltransferase
 : phosphate acetyltransferase
 : acetyl-CoA C-acetyltransferase
 : hydrogen-sulfide S-acetyltransferase
 : thioethanolamine S-acetyltransferase
 : dihydrolipoyllysine-residue acetyltransferase
 : glycine N-acyltransferase
 : glutamine N-phenylacetyltransferase
 : glycerol-3-phosphate O-acyltransferase
 : acetyl-CoA C-acyltransferase
 : aspartate N-acetyltransferase
 : galactoside O-acetyltransferase
 : phosphate butyryltransferase
 : diacylglycerol O-acyltransferase
 : carnitine O-palmitoyltransferase
 : 2-acylglycerol O-acyltransferase
 : 1-acylglycerophosphocholine O-acyltransferase
 : sphingosine N-acyltransferase
 : plasmalogen synthase
 : sterol O-acyltransferase
 : cortisol O-acetyltransferase
 : chloramphenicol O-acetyltransferase
 : glycine C-acetyltransferase
 : serine O-acetyltransferase
 : homoserine O-acetyltransferase
 : lysine N-acetyltransferase
 : histidine N-acetyltransferase
 : D-tryptophan N-acetyltransferase
 : glutamate N-acetyltransferase
 : D-amino-acid N-acetyltransferase
 : 5-aminolevulinate synthase
 : [acyl-carrier-protein] S-acetyltransferase
 : [acyl-carrier-protein] S-malonyltransferase
 : acyl-[acyl-carrier-protein]—phospholipid O-acyltransferase
 : β-ketoacyl-[acyl-carrier-protein] synthase I
 : glycerone-phosphate O-acyltransferase
 : phosphatidylcholine—sterol O-acyltransferase
 : N-acetylneuraminate 4-O-acetyltransferase
 : N-acetylneuraminate 7-O(or 9-O)-acetyltransferase
 : homoserine O-succinyltransferase
 : 8-amino-7-oxononanoate synthase
 : histone acetyltransferase
 : deacetyl-(citrate-(pro-3S)-lyase) S-acetyltransferase
 : serine C-palmitoyltransferase
 : 1-acylglycerol-3-phosphate O-acyltransferase
 : 2-acylglycerol-3-phosphate O-acyltransferase
 : phenylalanine N-acetyltransferase
 : formate C-acetyltransferase
 EC 2.3.1.55: identical to EC 2.3.1.82
 : aromatic-hydroxylamine O-acetyltransferase
 : diamine N-acetyltransferase
 : 2,3-diaminopropionate N-oxalyltransferase
 : gentamicin 2′-N-acetyltransferase
 : gentamicin 3′-N-acetyltransferase
 : dihydrolipoyllysine-residue succinyltransferase
 : 2-acylglycerophosphocholine O-acyltransferase
 : 1-alkylglycerophosphocholine O-acyltransferase
 : agmatine N4-coumaroyltransferase
 : bile acid-CoA:amino acid N-acyltransferase
 : leucine N-acetyltransferase
 : 1-alkylglycerophosphocholine O-acetyltransferase
 : glutamine N-acyltransferase
 : monoterpenol O-acetyltransferase
 EC 2.3.1.70: deleted
 : glycine N-benzoyltransferase
 : indoleacetylglucose—inositol O-acyltransferase
 : diacylglycerol—sterol O-acyltransferase
 : chalcone synthase
 : long-chain-alcohol O-fatty-acyltransferase
 : retinol O-fatty-acyltransferase
 : triacylglycerol—sterol O-acyltransferase
 : heparan-α-glucosaminide N-acetyltransferas
 : maltose O-acetyltransferase
 : cysteine-S-conjugate N-acetyltransferase
 : aminoglycoside 3-N-acetyltransferase
 : aminoglycoside 6′-N-acetyltransferase
 : phosphatidylcholine—dolichol O-acyltransferase
 : alcohol O-acetyltransferase
 : fatty-acid synthase system
 : fatty-acyl-CoA synthase system
 : aralkylamine N-acetyltransferase
 EC 2.3.1.88: Now covered by EC 2.3.1.254, EC 2.3.1.255, EC 2.3.1.256, EC 2.3.1.257, 2.3.1.258, and EC 2.3.1.259
 : tetrahydrodipicolinate N-acetyltransferase
 : β-glucogallin O-galloyltransferase
 : sinapoylglucose—choline O-sinapoyltransferase
 : sinapoylglucose—malate O-sinapoyltransferase
 : 13-hydroxylupinine O-tigloyltransferase
 : 6-deoxyerythronolide-B synthase
 : trihydroxystilbene synthase
 : glycoprotein N-palmitoyltransferase
 : glycylpeptide N-tetradecanoyltransferase
 : chlorogenate—glucarate O-hydroxycinnamoyltransferase
 : quinate O-hydroxycinnamoyltransferase
 : [myelin-proteolipid] O-palmitoyltransferase
 : formyl|methanofuran—tetrahydromethanopterin N-formyltransferase
 : N6-hydroxylysine O-acetyltransferase
 : sinapoylglucose—sinapoylglucose O-sinapoyltransferase
 EC 2.3.1.104: The activity is covered by EC 2.3.1.25
 : alkylglycerophosphate 2-O-acetyltransferase
 : tartronate O-hydroxycinnamoyltransferase
 : deacetylvindoline O-acetyltransferase
 : α-tubulin N-acetyltransferase
 : arginine N-succinyltransferase
 : tyramine N-feruloyltransferase
 : mycocerosate synthase
 : D-tryptophan N-malonyltransferase
 : anthranilate N-malonyltransferase
 : 3,4-dichloroaniline N-malonyltransferase
 : isoflavone-7-O-β-glucoside 6′′-O-malonyltransferase
 : lavonol-3-O-β-glucoside O-malonyltransferase
 : 2,3,4,5-tetrahydropyridine-2,6-dicarboxylate N-succinyltransferase
 : N-hydroxyarylamine O-acetyltransferase
 EC 2.3.1.119: Now covered by EC 2.3.1.199, EC 1.1.1.330,  EC 4.2.1.134 and EC 1.3.1.93
 EC 2.3.1.120: The reaction is due to EC 2.3.1.74
 : 1-alkenylglycerophosphoethanolamine O-acyltransferase
 : trehalose O-mycolyltransferase
 : dolichol O-acyltransferase
 EC 2.3.1.124: Already listed as EC 2.3.1.20
 : 1-alkyl-2-acetylglycerol O-acyltransferase
 : isocitrate O-dihydroxycinnamoyltransferase
 : ornithine N-benzoyltransferase
 EC 2.3.1.128: now classified as EC 2.3.1.266 and EC 2.3.1.267
 : acyl-[acyl-carrier-protein]—UDP-N-acetylglucosamine O-acyltransferase
 : galactarate O-hydroxycinnamoyltransferase
 : glucarate O-hydroxycinnamoyltransferase
 : glucarolactone O-hydroxycinnamoyltransferase
 : shikimate O-hydroxycinnamoyltransferase
 : galactolipid O-acyltransferase
 : phosphatidylcholine—retinol O-acyltransferase
 : polysialic-acid O-acetyltransferase
 : carnitine O-octanoyltransferase
 : putrescine N-hydroxycinnamoyltransferase
 : ecdysone O-acyltransferase
 : rosmarinate synthase
 : galactosylacylglycerol O-acyltransferase
 : glycoprotein O-fatty-acyltransferase
 : β-glucogallin—tetrakisgalloylglucose O-galloyltransferase
 : anthranilate N-benzoyltransferase
 : piperidine N-piperoyltransferase
 : pinosylvin synthase
 : glycerophospholipid arachidonoyl-transferase (CoA-independent)
 : glycerophospholipid acyltransferase (CoA-dependent)
 : platelet-activating factor acetyltransferase
 : salutaridinol 7-O-acetyltransferase
 : 2,3′,4,6-tetrahydroxybenzophenone synthase
 : alcohol O-cinnamoyltransferase
 : anthocyanin 5-(6′′′-hydroxycinnamoyltransferase)
 EC 2.3.1.154: Now EC 2.3.1.176
 : acetyl-CoA C-myristoyltransferase
 : phloroisovalerophenone synthase
 : glucosamine-1-phosphate N-acetyltransferase
 : phospholipid:diacylglycerol acyltransferase
 : acridone synthase
 : vinorine synthase
 : lovastatin nonaketide synthase
 : taxadien-5α-ol O-acetyltransferase
 : 10-hydroxytaxane O-acetyltransferase
 : isopenicillin-N N-acyltransferase
 : 6-methylsalicylic acid synthase
 : 2α-hydroxytaxane 2-O-benzoyltransferase
 : 10-deacetylbaccatin III 10-O-acetyltransferase
 : dihydrolipoyllysine-residue (2-methylpropanoyl)transferase
 : CO-methylating acetyl-CoA synthase
 : 6′-deoxychalcone synthase
 : anthocyanin 6′′-O-malonyltransferase
 : leachianone-G 2′′-dimethylallyltransferase
 : quinolinate synthase
 : O-phospho-L-seryl-tRNA:Cys-tRNA synthase
 : 1,4-dihydroxy-2-naphthoate polyprenyltransferase
 : tRNA dimethylallyltransferase
 : cysteate synthase
 EC 2.5.1.77: Now EC 2.5.1.147, 5-amino-6-(D-ribitylamino)uracil—L-tyrosine 4-methylphenol transferase and EC 4.3.1.32, 7,8-didemethyl-8-hydroxy-5-deazariboflavin synthase.
 : 6,7-dimethyl-8-ribityllumazine synthase
 : thermospermine synthase
 : 7-dimethylallyltryptophan synthase
 : geranylfarnesyl diphosphate synthase
 : hexaprenyl diphosphate synthase [geranylgeranyl-diphosphate specific]
 : hexaprenyl diphosphate synthase [(2E,6E)-farnesyl-diphosphate specific|all-trans-nonaprenyl diphosphate synthase [geranyl-diphosphate specific]]
 : all-trans-nonaprenyl-diphosphate synthase (geranyl-diphosphate specific)
 :  all-trans-nonaprenyl diphosphate synthase [geranylgeranyl-diphosphate specific]
 : trans,polycis-decaprenyl diphosphate synthase
 : ditrans,polycis-polyprenyl diphosphate synthase [(2E,6E)-farnesyl diphosphate specific]
 : trans,polycis-polyprenyl diphosphate synthase [(2Z,6E)-farnesyl diphosphate specific]
 : tritrans,polycis-undecaprenyl diphosphate synthase [geranylgeranyl-diphosphate specific]
 : all-trans-octaprenyl-diphosphate synthase
 : all-trans-decaprenyl-diphosphate synthase
 : (2Z,6Z)-farnesyl diphosphate synthase
 : 4-hydroxybenzoate geranyltransferase
 : adenozil-chloride synthase
 : xanthan ketal pyruvate transferase
 : 4,4′-diapophytoene synthase
 : pseudaminic acid synthase
 : Rhizobium leguminosarum exopolysaccharide glucosyl ketal-pyruvate-transferase
 EC 2.5.1.99:  The activity was an artifact caused by photoisomerization of the product of EC 2.5.1.32, 15-cis-phytoene synthase
 : fumigaclavine A dimethylallyltransferase
 : N,N′-diacetyllegionaminate synthase
 : geranyl-pyrophosphate—olivetolic acid geranyltransferase
 : presqualene diphosphate synthase
 Most of the following entries have no Wikipedia articles 
 EC 2.5.1.104: N1-aminopropylagmatine synthase
 EC 2.5.1.105: 7,8-dihydropterin-6-yl-methyl-4-(β-D-ribofuranosyl)aminobenzene 5′-phosphate synthase
 EC 2.5.1.106: tryprostatin B synthase
 EC 2.5.1.107: verruculogen prenyltransferase
 EC 2.5.1.108: 2-(3-amino-3-carboxypropyl)histidine synthase
 EC 2.5.1.109: brevianamide F prenyltransferase (deoxybrevianamide E-forming)
 EC 2.5.1.110: 12α,13α-dihydroxyfumitremorgin C prenyltransferase
 EC 2.5.1.111: 4-hydroxyphenylpyruvate 3-dimethylallyltransferase
 EC 2.5.1.112: adenylate dimethylallyltransferase (ADP/ATP-dependent)
 EC 2.5.1.113: [CysO sulfur-carrier protein]-thiocarboxylate-dependent cysteine synthase
 EC 2.5.1.114: tRNAPhe (4-demethylwyosine37-C7) aminocarboxypropyltransferase
 EC 2.5.1.115: homogentisate phytyltransferase
 EC 2.5.1.116: homogentisate geranylgeranyltransferase
 EC 2.5.1.117: homogentisate solanesyltransferase
 EC 2.5.1.118: β-(isoxazolin-5-on-2-yl)-L-alanine synthase
 EC 2.5.1.119: β-(isoxazolin-5-on-4-yl)-L-alanine synthase
 EC 2.5.1.120: aminodeoxyfutalosine synthase
 EC 2.5.1.121: 5,10-dihydrophenazine-1-carboxylate 9-dimethylallyltransferase
 EC 2.5.1.122: 4-O-dimethylallyl-L-tyrosine synthase
 EC 2.5.1.123: flaviolin linalyltransferase
 EC 2.5.1.124: 6-linalyl-2-O,3-dimethylflaviolin synthase
 EC 2.5.1.125: 7-geranyloxy-5-hydroxy-2-methoxy-3-methylnaphthalene-1,4-dione synthase
 EC 2.5.1.126: norspermine synthase
 EC 2.5.1.127: caldopentamine synthase
 EC 2.5.1.128: N4-bis(aminopropyl)spermidine synthase
 : flavin prenyltransferase
 EC 2.5.1.130: 2-carboxy-1,4-naphthoquinone phytyltransferase
 EC 2.5.1.131: (4-{4-[2-(γ-L-glutamylamino)ethyl]phenoxymethyl}furan-2-yl)methanamine synthase
 EC 2.5.1.132: 3-deoxy-D-glycero-D-galacto-nonulopyranosonate 9-phosphate synthase
 EC 2.5.1.133: bacteriochlorophyll a synthase
 EC 2.5.1.134: cystathionine β-synthase (O-acetyl-L-serine)
 EC 2.5.1.135: validamine 7-phosphate valienyltransferase
 EC 2.5.1.136: 2-acylphloroglucinol 4-prenyltransferase
 EC 2.5.1.137: 2-acyl-4-prenylphloroglucinol 6-prenyltransferase
 EC 2.5.1.138: coumarin 8-geranyltransferase
 EC 2.5.1.139: umbelliferone 6-dimethylallyltransferase
 EC 2.5.1.140: N-(2-amino-2-carboxyethyl)-L-glutamate synthase
 EC 2.5.1.141: heme o synthase
 EC 2.5.1.142: nerylneryl diphosphate synthase
 EC 2.5.1.143: pyridinium-3,5-biscarboxylic acid mononucleotide synthase
 EC 2.5.1.144: S-sulfo-L-cysteine synthase (O-acetyl-L-serine-dependent)
 EC 2.5.1.145: phosphatidylglycerol—prolipoprotein diacylglyceryl transferase
 EC 2.5.1.146: 3-geranyl-3-[(Z)-2-isocyanoethenyl]indole synthase
 EC 2.5.1.147: 5-amino-6-(D-ribitylamino)uracil—L-tyrosine 4-hydroxyphenyl transferase
 EC 2.5.1.148: lycopaoctaene synthase
 EC 2.5.1.149: lycopene elongase/hydratase (flavuxanthin-forming)
 EC 2.5.1.150: lycopene elongase/hydratase (dihydrobisanhydrobacterioruberin-forming)
 EC 2.5.1.151: alkylcobalamin dealkylase
 EC 2.5.1.152: D-histidine 2-aminobutanoyltransferase
 EC 2.5.1.153: adenosine tuberculosinyltransferase

EC 2.6: Transferring Nitrogenous Groups
EC 2.6.1: Transaminases
 : aspartate transaminase
 : alanine transaminase
 : cysteine transaminase
 : glycine transaminase
 : tyrosine transaminase
 : leucine transaminase
 : kynurenine—oxoglutarate transaminase
 : 2,5-diaminovalerate transaminase
 : histidinol-phosphate transaminase
 EC 2.6.1.10: deleted, included with EC 2.6.1.21, D-amino-acid transaminase
 : acetylornithine transaminase
 : alanine—oxo-acid transaminase
 : ornithine aminotransferase
 : asparagine—oxo-acid transaminase
 : glutamine—pyruvate transaminase
 : glutamine—fructose-6-phosphate transaminase (isomerizing)
 : succinyldiaminopimelate transaminase
 : β-alanine—pyruvate transaminase
 : 4-aminobutyrate transaminase
 : deleted
 : D-amino-acid transaminase
 : (S)-3-amino-2-methylpropionate transaminase
 : 4-hydroxyglutamate transaminase
 : diiodotyrosine transaminase
 EC 2.6.1.25: deleted, Now included with EC 2.6.1.24 diiodotyrosine transaminase
 : thyroid-hormone transaminase
 : tryptophan transaminase
 : tryptophan—phenylpyruvate transaminase
 : diamine transaminase
 : pyridoxamine—pyruvate transaminase
 : pyridoxamine—oxaloacetate transaminase
 : valine—3-methyl-2-oxovalerate transaminase
 : dTDP-4-amino-4,6-dideoxy-D-glucose transaminase
 : UDP-N-acetylbacillosamine transaminase
 : glycine—oxaloacetate transaminase
 : L-lysine 6-transaminase
 : (2-aminoethyl)phosphonate—pyruvate transaminase
 : histidine transaminase
 : 2-aminoadipate transaminase
 : (R)-3-amino-2-methylpropionate—pyruvate transaminase
 : D-methionine—pyruvate transaminase
 : branched-chain-amino-acid transaminase
 : aminolevulinate transaminase
 : alanine—glyoxylate transaminase
 : serine—glyoxylate transaminase
 : diaminobutyrate—pyruvate transaminase
 : alanine—oxomalonate transaminase
 : 5-aminovalerate transaminase
 : dihydroxyphenylalanine transaminase
 : glutamine—scyllo-inositol transaminase
 : serine—pyruvate transaminase
 : phosphoserine transaminase
 EC 2.6.1.53: Now EC 1.4.1.13, glutamate synthase (NADPH)
 : pyridoxamine-phosphate transaminase
 : taurine—2-oxoglutarate transaminase
 : 1D-1-guanidino-3-amino-1,3-dideoxy-scyllo-inositol transaminase
 : aromatic-amino-acid transaminase
 : phenylalanine(histidine) transaminase
 : dTDP-4-amino-4,6-dideoxygalactose transaminase
 : aromatic-amino-acid—glyoxylate transaminase
 EC 2.6.1.61: identical to EC 2.6.1.40, (R)-3-amino-2-methylpropionate—pyruvate transaminase
 : adenosylmethionine—8-amino-7-oxononanoate transaminase
 : kynurenine—glyoxylate transaminase
 : glutamine—phenylpyruvate transaminase
 : N6-acetyl-β-lysine transaminase
 : valine—pyruvate transaminase
 : 2-aminohexanoate transaminase
 EC 2.6.1.68: Now classified as EC 2.6.1.13, ornithine aminotransferase and EC 2.6.1.36, L-lysine 6-transaminase
 EC 2.6.1.69: identical to EC 2.6.1.11, acetylornithine transaminase
 : aspartate—phenylpyruvate transaminase
 : lysine—pyruvate 6-transaminase
 : D-4-hydroxyphenylglycine transaminase
 : methionine—glyoxylate transaminase
 : cephalosporin-C transaminase
 : cysteine-conjugate transaminase
 : diaminobutyrate—2-oxoglutarate transaminase
 : taurine—pyruvate aminotransferase
 : aspartate—prephenate aminotransferase
 : glutamate—prephenate aminotransferase
 : nicotianamine aminotransferase
 : succinylornithine transaminase
 : putrescine aminotransferase
 : LL-diaminopimelate aminotransferase
 : arginine—pyruvate transaminase
 : aminodeoxychorismate synthase
 : 2-amino-4-deoxychorismate synthase
 : UDP-4-amino-4-deoxy-L-arabinose aminotransferase
 : metionin transaminase
 : dTDP-3-amino-3,6-dideoxy-α-D-glucopyranose transaminase
 : dTDP-3-amino-3,6-dideoxy-α-D-galactopyranose transaminase
 EC 2.6.1.91: Identical to EC 2.6.1.34, UDP-N-acetylbacillosamine transaminase
 : UDP-4-amino-4,6-dideoxy-N-acetyl-β-L-altrosamine transaminase
 : neamine transaminase
 : 2′-deamino-2′-hydroxyneamine transaminase
 : neomycin C transaminase
 : 4-aminobutyrate—pyruvate transaminase
 : archaeosine synthase
 : UDP-2-acetamido-2-deoxy-ribo-hexuluronate aminotransferase
 : L-tryptophan—pyruvate aminotransferase
 EC 2.6.1.100: L-glutamine:2-deoxy-scyllo-inosose aminotransferase (*) 
 EC 2.6.1.101: L-glutamine:3-amino-2,3-dideoxy-scyllo-inosose aminotransferase (*) 
 EC 2.6.1.102: GDP-perosamine synthase (*) 
 EC 2.6.1.103: (S)-3,5-dihydroxyphenylglycine transaminase (*) 
 EC 2.6.1.104: 3-dehydro-glucose-6-phosphate—glutamate transaminase (*) 
 EC 2.6.1.105: lysine—8-amino-7-oxononanoate transaminase (*) 
 EC 2.6.1.106: dTDP-3-amino-3,4,6-trideoxy-α-D-glucose transaminase (*) 
 EC 2.6.1.107: β-methylphenylalanine transaminase (*) 
 EC 2.6.1.108: (5-formylfuran-3-yl)methyl phosphate transaminase (*) 
 EC 2.6.1.109: 8-amino-3,8-dideoxy-α-D-manno-octulosonate transaminase (*) 
 EC 2.6.1.110: dTDP-4-dehydro-2,3,6-trideoxy-D-glucose 4-aminotransferase (*) 
 EC 2.6.1.111: 3-aminobutanoyl-CoA transaminase (*) 
 EC 2.6.1.112: (S)-ureidoglycine—glyoxylate transaminase (*) 
 EC 2.6.1.113: putrescine—pyruvate transaminase (*) 
 EC 2.6.1.114: 8-demethyl-8-aminoriboflavin-5′-phosphate synthase (*) 
 EC 2.6.1.115: 5-hydroxydodecatetraenal 1-aminotransferase (*) 
 EC 2.6.1.116: 6-aminohexanoate aminotransferase (*) 
 EC 2.6.1.117: L-glutamine—4-(methylsulfanyl)-2-oxobutanoate aminotransferase (*) 
 EC 2.6.1.118: [amino-group carrier protein]-γ-(L-lysyl)-L-glutamate aminotransferase (*) 
 EC 2.6.1.119: vanillin aminotransferase (*)
(*) No Wikipedia article

EC 2.6.2: Amidinotransferases (deleted sub-subclass)
 EC 2.6.2.1: now EC 2.1.4.1 glycine amidinotransferase

EC 2.6.3: Oximinotransferases
 : oximinotransferase

EC 2.6.99: Transferring Other Nitrogenous Groups
 : dATP(dGTP)—DNA purinetransferase
 : pyridoxine 5′-phosphate synthase
 EC 2.6.99.3: O-ureido-L-serine synthase	 
 2.6.99.4: Now EC 2.3.1.234, N6-L-threonylcarbamoyladenine synthase.

EC 2.7: Transferring Phosphorus-Containing Groups
EC 2.7.1: Phosphotransferases with an alcohol group as acceptor
 : hexokinase
 : glucokinase
 : ketohexokinase
 : fructokinase
 : rhamnulokinase
 : galactokinase
 : mannokinase
 : glucosamine kinase
 EC 2.7.1.9: deleted
 : phosphoglucokinase
 : 6-phosphofructokinase
 : gluconokinase
 : dehydrogluconokinase
 : sedoheptulokinase
 : ribokinase
 : ribulokinase
 : xylulokinase
 : phosphoribokinase
 : phosphoribulokinase
 : adenosine kinase
 : thymidine kinase
 : ribosylnicotinamide kinase
 : NAD+ kinase
 : dephospho-CoA kinase
 : adenylyl-sulfate kinase
 : riboflavin kinase
 : erythritol kinase (D-erythritol 4-phosphate-forming)
 : triokinase
 : glycerone kinase
 : glycerol kinase
 : glycerate kinase
 : choline kinase
 : pantothenate kinase
 : pantetheine kinase
 : pyridoxal kinase
 : mevalonate kinase
 EC 2.7.1.37: now divided into EC 2.7.11.1, EC 2.7.11.8, EC 2.7.11.9, EC 2.7.11.10, EC 2.7.11.11, EC 2.7.11.12, EC 2.7.11.13, EC 2.7.11.21, EC 2.7.11.22, EC 2.7.11.24, EC 2.7.11.25, EC 2.7.11.30 and EC 2.7.12.1
 EC 2.7.1.38: now EC 2.7.11.19, phosphorylase kinase
 : homoserine kinase
 : pyruvate kinase
 : glucose-1-phosphate phosphodismutase
 : riboflavin phosphotransferase
 : glucuronokinase
 : galacturonokinase
 : 2-dehydro-3-deoxygluconokinase
 : L-arabinokinase
 : D-ribulokinase
 : uridine kinase
 : hydroxymethylpyrimidine kinase
 : hydroxyethylthiazole kinase
 : L-fuculokinase
 : fucokinase
 : L-xylulokinase
 : D-arabinokinase
 : allose kinase
 : 1-phosphofructokinase
 EC 2.7.1.57: deleted
 : 2-dehydro-3-deoxygalactonokinase
 : N-acetylglucosamine kinase
 : N-acylmannosamine kinase
 : acyl-phosphate—hexose phosphotransferase
 : Phosphoramidate-hexose phosphotransferase
 : polyphosphate—glucose phosphotransferase
 : inositol 3-kinase
 : scyllo-inosamine 4-kinase
 : undecaprenol kinase
 : 1-phosphatidylinositol 4-kinase
 : 1-phosphatidylinositol-4-phosphate 5-kinase
 EC 2.7.1.69: now covered by EC 2.7.1.191, EC 2.7.1.192, EC 2.7.1.193, EC 2.7.1.194, EC 2.7.1.195, EC 2.7.1.196, EC 2.7.1.197, EC 2.7.1.198, EC 2.7.1.199, EC 2.7.1.200, EC 2.7.1.20, EC 2.7.1.202, EC 2.7.1.203, EC 2.7.1.204, EC 2.7.1.205, EC 2.7.1.206, EC 2.7.1.207 and EC 2.7.1.208
 EC 2.7.1.70: Now included in EC 2.7.11.1, non-specific serine/threonine protein kinase
 : shikimate kinase
 : streptomycin 6-kinase
 : inosine kinase
 : deoxycytidine kinase
 EC 2.7.1.75: Now EC 2.7.1.21 thymidine kinase
 : deoxyadenosine kinase
 : nucleoside phosphotransferase
 : polynucleotide 5′-hydroxyl-kinase
 : diphosphate—glycerol phosphotransferase
 : diphosphate—serine phosphotransferase
 : hydroxylysine kinase
 : ethanolamine kinase
 : pseudouridine kinase
 : alkylglycerone kinase
 : β-glucoside kinase
 : NADH kinase
 : streptomycin 3′′-kinase
 : dihydrostreptomycin-6-phosphate 3′α-kinase
 : thiamine kinase
 : diphosphate—fructose-6-phosphate 1-phosphotransferase
 : sphinganine kinase
 : 5-dehydro-2-deoxygluconokinase
 : alkylglycerol kinase
 : acylglycerol kinase
 : kanamycin kinase
 EC 2.7.1.96: deleted, Now included with EC 2.7.1.86 NADH kinase
 EC 2.7.1.97: deleted, Identical with EC 2.7.11.14, rhodopsin kinase
 EC 2.7.1.98: deleted
 EC 2.7.1.99: Now EC 2.7.11.2, [pyruvate dehydrogenase (acetyl-transferring)] kinase
 : S-methyl-5-thioribose kinase
 : tagatose kinase
 : hamamelose kinase
 : viomycin kinase
 EC 2.7.1.104: Now EC 2.7.99.1, triphosphate—protein phosphotransferase
 : 6-phosphofructo-2-kinase
 : glucose-1,6-bisphosphate synthase
 : diacylglycerol kinase
 : dolichol kinase
 EC 2.7.1.109: Now EC 2.7.11.31, [hydroxymethylglutaryl-CoA reductase (NADPH)] kinase
 EC 2.7.1.110: Now EC 2.7.11.3, dephospho-[reductase kinase] kinase
 EC 2.7.1.111: Now listed as EC 2.7.11.27, [acetyl-CoA carboxylase] kinase
 EC 2.7.1.112: Now EC 2.7.10.2, non-specific protein-tyrosine kinase
 : deoxyguanosine kinase
 : AMP—thymidine kinase
 EC 2.7.1.115: Now EC 2.7.11.4, [3-methyl-2-oxobutanoate dehydrogenase (acetyl-transferring)] kinase
 EC 2.7.1.116: Now EC 2.7.11.5, [isocitrate dehydrogenase (NADP+)] kinase
 EC 2.7.1.117: Now EC 2.7.11.18, myosin-light-chain kinase
 : ADP—thymidine kinase
 : hygromycin-B 7′′-O-kinase
 EC 2.7.1.120: Now EC 2.7.11.17, Ca2+/calmodulin-dependent protein kinase
 : phosphoenolpyruvate—glycerone phosphotransferase
 : xylitol kinase
 EC 2.7.1.123: Now EC 2.7.11.17, Ca2+/calmodulin-dependent protein kinase
 EC 2.7.1.124: Now EC 2.7.11.6, [tyrosine 3-monooxygenase] kinase
 EC 2.7.1.125: Now EC 2.7.11.14, rhodopsin kinase
 EC 2.7.1.126: Now EC 2.7.11.15, β-adrenergic-receptor kinase
 : inositol-trisphosphate 3-kinase
 EC 2.7.1.128: Now EC 2.7.11.27, [acetyl-CoA carboxylase] kinase
 EC 2.7.1.12}: Now EC 2.7.11.7, myosin-heavy-chain kinase* EC * : tetraacyldisaccharide 4′-kinase
 EC 2.7.1.131: Now EC 2.7.11.29, low-density-lipoprotein receptor kinase
 EC 2.7.1.132: Now EC 2.7.11.28, tropomyosin kinase
 EC 2.7.1.133: Now included with EC 2.7.1.134, inositol-tetrakisphosphate 1-kinase
 : inositol-tetrakisphosphate 1-kinase
 EC 2.7.1.135: Now EC 2.7.11.26, tau-protein kinase
 : macrolide 2′-kinase
 : phosphatidylinositol 3-kinase
 : ceramide kinase
 EC 2.7.1.139: Now included with EC 2.7.1.134, inositol-tetrakisphosphate 1-kinase
 : inositol-tetrakisphosphate 5-kinase
 EC 2.7.1.141: Now EC 2.7.11.23, [RNA-polymerase]-subunit kinase
 : glycerol-3-phosphate—glucose phosphotransferase
 : diphosphate-purine nucleoside kinase
 : tagatose-6-phosphate kinase
 : deoxynucleoside kinase
 : ADP-dependent phosphofructokinase
 : ADP-dependent glucokinase
 : 4-(cytidine 5′-diphospho)-2-C-methyl-D-erythritol kinase
 : 1-phosphatidylinositol-5-phosphate 4-kinase
 : 1-phosphatidylinositol-3-phosphate 5-kinase
 : inositol-polyphosphate multikinase
 EC 2.7.1.152: Now EC 2.7.4.21, inositol-hexakisphosphate kinase
 : phosphatidylinositol-4,5-bisphosphate 3-kinase
 : phosphatidylinositol-4-phosphate 3-kinase
 EC 2.7.1.155: Now EC 2.7.4.24, diphosphoinositol-pentakisphosphate kinase
 : adenosylcobinamide kinase
 : N-acetylgalactosamine kinase
 : inositol-pentakisphosphate 2-kinase
 : inositol-1,3,4-trisphosphate 5/6-kinase
 : 2′-phosphotransferase
 : CTP-dependent riboflavin kinase
 : N-acetylhexosamine 1-kinase
 : hygromycin B 4-O-kinase
 : O-phosphoseryl-tRNASec kinase
 : glycerate 2-kinase
 : 3-deoxy-D-manno-octulosonic acid kinase
 : D-glycero-β-D-manno-heptose-7-phosphate kinase
 : D-glycero-α-D-manno-heptose-7-phosphate kinase
 : pantoate kinase
 : anhydro-N-acetylmuramic acid kinase
 : protein-fructosamine 3-kinase
 : protein-ribulosamine 3-kinase
 : nicotinate riboside kinase
 : diacylglycerol kinase (CTP dependent)
 : maltokinase
 : UDP-N-acetylglucosamine kinase
 : L-threonine kinase
The remaining entries lack Wikipedia articles
 EC 2.7.1.178: 2-dehydro-3-deoxyglucono/galactono-kinase	 
 EC 2.7.1.179: kanosamine kinase	 
 EC 2.7.1.180: FAD:protein FMN transferase	 
 EC 2.7.1.181: polymannosyl GlcNAc-diphospho-ditrans,octacis-undecaprenol kinase	 
 EC 2.7.1.182: phytol kinase	 
 EC 2.7.1.183: glycoprotein-mannosyl O6-kinase	 
 EC 2.7.1.184: sulfofructose kinase	 
 EC 2.7.1.185: mevalonate 3-kinase	 
 EC 2.7.1.186: mevalonate-3-phosphate 5-kinase	 
 EC 2.7.1.187: acarbose 7IV-phosphotransferase	 
 EC 2.7.1.188: 2-epi-5-epi-valiolone 7-kinase	 
 EC 2.7.1.189: autoinducer-2 kinase	 
 EC 2.7.1.190: aminoglycoside 2′′-phosphotransferase	 
 EC 2.7.1.191: protein-N π-phosphohistidine—D-mannose phosphotransferase	 
 EC 2.7.1.192: protein-N π-phosphohistidine—N-acetylmuramate phosphotransferase	 
 EC 2.7.1.193: protein-N π-phosphohistidine—N-acetyl-D-glucosamine phosphotransferase	 
 EC 2.7.1.194: protein-N π-phosphohistidine—L-ascorbate phosphotransferase	 
 EC 2.7.1.195: protein-N π-phosphohistidine—2-O-α-mannosyl-D-glycerate phosphotransferase	 
 EC 2.7.1.196: protein-N π-phosphohistidine—N,N′-diacetylchitobiose phosphotransferase	 
 EC 2.7.1.197: protein-Nπ'-phosphohistidine—D-mannitol phosphotransferase	 
 EC 2.7.1.198: protein-N π-phosphohistidine—D-sorbitol phosphotransferase	 
 EC 2.7.1.199: protein-N π-phosphohistidine—D-glucose phosphotransferase	 
 EC 2.7.1.200: protein-N π-phosphohistidine—galactitol phosphotransferase	 
 EC 2.7.1.201: protein-N π-phosphohistidine—trehalose phosphotransferase	 
 EC 2.7.1.202: protein-N π-phosphohistidine—D-fructose phosphotransferase	 
 EC 2.7.1.203: protein-N π-phosphohistidine—D-glucosaminate phosphotransferase	 
 EC 2.7.1.204: protein-N π-phosphohistidine—D-galactose phosphotransferase	 
 EC 2.7.1.205: protein-N π-phosphohistidine—cellobiose phosphotransferase	 
 EC 2.7.1.206: protein-N π-phosphohistidine—L-sorbose phosphotransferase	 
 EC 2.7.1.207: protein-N π-phosphohistidine—lactose phosphotransferase	 
 EC 2.7.1.208: protein-N π-phosphohistidine—maltose phosphotransferase	 
 EC 2.7.1.209: L-erythrulose 1-kinase	 
 EC 2.7.1.210: D-erythrulose 4-kinase	 
 EC 2.7.1.211: protein-N π-phosphohistidine—sucrose phosphotransferase	 
 EC 2.7.1.212: α-D-ribose-1-phosphate 5-kinase (ADP)	 
 EC 2.7.1.213: cytidine kinase	 
 EC 2.7.1.214: C7-cyclitol 7-kinase	 
 EC 2.7.1.215: erythritol kinase (D-erythritol 1-phosphate-forming)	 
 EC 2.7.1.216: farnesol kinase	 
 EC 2.7.1.217: 3-dehydrotetronate 4-kinase	 
 EC 2.7.1.218: fructoselysine 6-kinase	 
 EC 2.7.1.219: D-threonate 4-kinase	 
 EC 2.7.1.220: D-erythronate 4-kinase	 
 EC 2.7.1.221: N-acetylmuramate 1-kinase	 
 EC 2.7.1.222: 4-hydroxytryptamine kinase	 
 EC 2.7.1.223: aminoimidazole riboside kinase	 
 EC 2.7.1.224: cytidine diphosphoramidate kinase	 
 EC 2.7.1.225: L-serine kinase (ATP)	 
 EC 2.7.1.226: L-serine kinase (ADP)	 
 EC 2.7.1.227: inositol phosphorylceramide synthase	 
 EC 2.7.1.228: mannosyl-inositol-phosphoceramide inositolphosphotransferase	 
 EC 2.7.1.229: deoxyribokinase	 
 EC 2.7.1.230: amicoumacin kinase	 
 EC 2.7.1.231: 3-oxoisoapionate kinase	 
 EC 2.7.1.232: levoglucosan kinase	 
 EC 2.7.1.233: apulose kinase

EC 2.7.2: Phosphotransferases with a carboxy group as acceptor
 : acetate kinase
 : carbamate kinase
 : phosphoglycerate kinase
 : aspartate kinase
 EC 2.7.2.5: Now EC 6.3.4.16, carbamoyl-phosphate synthase (ammonia)
 : formate kinase
 : butyrate kinase
 : acetylglutamate kinase
 EC 2.7.2.9: Now EC 6.3.5.5, carbamoyl-phosphate synthase (glutamine-hydrolysing)
 : phosphoglycerate kinase (GTP)
 : glutamate 5-kinase
 : acetate kinase (diphosphate)
 EC 2.7.2.13: Now known to be due to the activities of EC 6.1.1.17, glutamate—tRNA ligase, EC 1.2.1.70, glutamyl-tRNA reductase and EC 5.4.3.8
 : branched-chain-fatty-acid kinase
 : propionate kinase
 EC 2.7.2.16: 2-phosphoglycerate kinase (*)	 
 EC 2.7.2.17: [amino-group carrier protein]-L-2-aminoadipate 6-kinase (*)	 
 EC 2.7.2.18: fatty acid kinase (*)
(*) No Wikipedia article

EC 2.7.3: Phosphotransferases with a nitrogenous group as acceptor
 : guanidinoacetate kinase
 : creatine kinase
 : arginine kinase
 : taurocyamine kinase
 : lombricine kinase
 : hypotaurocyamine kinase
 : opheline kinase
 : ammonia kinase
 : phosphoenolpyruvate—protein phosphotransferase
 : agmatine kinase
 EC 2.7.3.11: now EC 2.7.13.1, protein-histidine pros-kinase
 EC 2.7.3.12: now EC 2.7.13.2, protein-histidine tele-kinase
 EC 2.7.3.13: glutamine kinase (*)
(*) No Wikipedia article

EC 2.7.4: Phosphotransferases with a phosphate group as acceptor
 : ATP-polyphosphate phosphotransferase
 : phosphomevalonate kinase
 : adenylate kinase
 : nucleoside-phosphate kinase
 EC 2.7.4.5: deleted, Now included with EC 2.7.4.14 cytidylate kinase
 : nucleoside-diphosphate kinase
 : phosphomethylpyrimidine kinase
 : guanylate kinase
 : dTMP kinase
 : nucleoside-triphosphate—adenylate kinase
 : (deoxy)adenylate kinase
 : T2-induced deoxynucleotide kinase
 : (deoxy)nucleoside-phosphate kinase
 : cytidylate kinase
 : thiamine-diphosphate kinase
 : thiamine-phosphate kinase
 : 3-phosphoglyceroyl-phosphate—polyphosphate phosphotransferase
 : farnesyl-diphosphate kinase
 : 5-methyldeoxycytidine-5′-phosphate kinase
 : dolichyl-diphosphate—polyphosphate phosphotransferase
 : inositol-hexakisphosphate kinase
 : UMP kinase
 : ribose 1,5-bisphosphate phosphokinase
 : diphosphoinositol-pentakisphosphate kinase
 : (d)CMP kinase
 : isopentenyl phosphate kinase
 : [pyruvate, phosphate dikinase]-phosphate phosphotransferase
 : [pyruvate, water dikinase]-phosphate phosphotransferase
 EC 2.7.4.29: Kdo2-lipid A phosphotransferase (*)
 EC 2.7.4.30: Now EC 2.7.8.43, lipid A phosphoethanolamine transferase	 
 EC 2.7.4.31: [5-(aminomethyl)furan-3-yl]methyl phosphate kinase (*)	 
 EC 2.7.4.32: farnesyl phosphate kinase (*)	 
 EC 2.7.4.33: AMP-polyphosphate phosphotransferase (*)	 
 EC 2.7.4.34: GDP-polyphosphate phosphotransferase (*)
(*) No Wikipedia article

EC 2.7.5: Phosphotransferases with regeneration of donors, apparently catalysing intramolecular transfers
Deleted sub-subclass

EC 2.7.6: Diphosphotransferases
 : ribose-phosphate diphosphokinase
 : thiamine diphosphokinase
 : 2-amino-4-hydroxy-6-hydroxymethyldihydropteridine diphosphokinase
 : nucleotide diphosphokinase
 : GTP diphosphokinase

EC 2.7.7: Nucleotidyltransferases
 : nicotinamide-nucleotide adenylyltransferase
 : FAD synthase
 : pantetheine-phosphate adenylyltransferase
 : sulfate adenylyltransferase
 : sulfate adenylyltransferase (ADP)
 : DNA-directed RNA polymerase
 : DNA-directed DNA polymerase
 : polyribonucleotide nucleotidyltransferase
 : UTP—glucose-1-phosphate uridylyltransferase
 : UTP—hexose-1-phosphate uridylyltransferase
 : UTP—xylose-1-phosphate uridylyltransferase
 : UDP-glucose—hexose-1-phosphate uridylyltransferase
 : mannose-1-phosphate guanylyltransferase
 : ethanolamine-phosphate cytidylyltransferase
 : choline-phosphate cytidylyltransferase
 EC 2.7.7.16: now EC 3.1.27.5
 EC 2.7.7.17: now EC 3.1.27.1
 : nicotinate-nucleotide adenylyltransferase
 : polynucleotide adenylyltransferase
 EC 2.7.7.20: deleted (identical with EC 2.7.7.25, tRNA adenylyltransferase)
 EC 2.7.7.21: Now EC 2.7.7.72, CCA tRNA nucleotidyltransferase
 : mannose-1-phosphate guanylyltransferase (GDP)
 : UDP-N-acetylglucosamine diphosphorylase
 : glucose-1-phosphate thymidylyltransferase
 EC 2.7.7.25: Now EC 2.7.7.72, CCA tRNA nucleotidyltransferase
 EC 2.7.7.26: Now EC 3.1.27.3, ribonuclease T1 
 : glucose-1-phosphate adenylyltransferase
 : nucleoside-triphosphate-hexose-1-phosphate nucleotidyltransferase
 EC 2.7.7.29: identical to EC 2.7.7.28, nucleoside-triphosphate-aldose-1-phosphate nucleotidyltransferase
 : fucose-1-phosphate guanylyltransferase
 : DNA nucleotidylexotransferase
 : galactose-1-phosphate thymidylyltransferase
 : glucose-1-phosphate cytidylyltransferase
 : glucose-1-phosphate guanylyltransferase
 : ribose-5-phosphate adenylyltransferase
 : aldose-1-phosphate adenylyltransferase
 : aldose-1-phosphate nucleotidyltransferase
 : 3-deoxy-manno-octulosonate cytidylyltransferase
 : glycerol-3-phosphate cytidylyltransferase
 : D-ribitol-5-phosphate cytidylyltransferase
 : phosphatidate cytidylyltransferase
 : [glutamine synthetase] adenylyltransferase
 : N-acylneuraminate cytidylyltransferase
 : glucuronate-1-phosphate uridylyltransferase
 : guanosine-triphosphate guanylyltransferase
 : gentamicin 2′′-nucleotidyltransferase
 : streptomycin 3′′-adenylyltransferase
 : RNA-directed RNA polymerase
 : RNA-directed DNA polymerase
 : mRNA guanylyltransferase
 : adenylylsulfate—ammonia adenylyltransferase
 : RNA uridylyltransferase
 : ATP adenylyltransferase
 EC 2.7.7.54: The activity is part of EC 6.3.2.40, cyclopeptine synthase
 EC 2.7.7.55: The activity is part of EC 6.3.2.40, cyclopeptine synthase
 : tRNA nucleotidyltransferase
 : N-methylphosphoethanolamine cytidylyltransferase
 EC 2.7.7.58: Now included in EC 6.2.1.71, 2,3-dihydroxybenzoate[aryl-carrier protein] ligase
 :  [protein-PII] uridylyltransferase
 : 2-C-methyl-D-erythritol 4-phosphate cytidylyltransferase
 : citrate lyase holo-[acyl-carrier protein] synthase
 : adenosylcobinamide-phosphate guanylyltransferase
 EC 2.7.7.63: Now EC 6.3.1.20, lipoate—protein ligase
 : UTP-monosaccharide-1-phosphate uridylyltransferase
 : diguanylate cyclase
 : malonate decarboxylase holo-[acyl-carrier protein] synthase
 : CDP-2,3-bis-(O-geranylgeranyl)-sn-glycerol synthase
 : 2-phospho-L-lactate guanylyltransferase
 : GDP-L-galactose/GDP-D-glucose: hexose 1-phosphate guanylyltransferase
 : D-glycero-β-D-manno-heptose 1-phosphate adenylyltransferase
 : D-glycero-α-D-manno-heptose 1-phosphate guanylyltransferase
 : CCA tRNA nucleotidyltransferase
 : sulfur carrier protein ThiS adenylyltransferase
 : 1L-myo-inositol 1-phosphate cytidylyltransferase
 : molybdopterin adenylyltransferase
 : molybdenum cofactor cytidylyltransferase
 : molybdenum cofactor guanylyltransferase
 : GDP-D-glucose phosphorylase
 : tRNAHis guanylyltransferase
 : molybdopterin-synthase adenylyltransferase
 : pseudaminic acid cytidylyltransferase
 : CMP-N,N′-diacetyllegionaminic acid synthase
 : UDP-N-acetylgalactosamine diphosphorylase
 : diadenylate cyclase
 : 2′-5′ oligoadenylate synthase
 : cyclic GMP-AMP synthase
The remaining entries have no Wikipedia articles
 EC 2.7.7.87: L- synthase	 
 EC 2.7.7.88: GDP polyribonucleotidyltransferase	 
 EC 2.7.7.89: [glutamine synthetase]-adenylyl-L-tyrosine phosphorylase	 
 EC 2.7.7.90: 8-amino-3,8-dideoxy-manno-octulosonate cytidylyltransferase	 
 EC 2.7.7.91: valienol-1-phosphate guanylyltransferase	 
 EC 2.7.7.92: 3-deoxy-D-glycero-D-galacto-nonulopyranosonate cytidylyltransferase	 
 EC 2.7.7.93: phosphonoformate cytidylyltransferase	 
 EC 2.7.7.94: Now EC 6.2.1.51, 4-hydroxyphenylalkanoate adenylyltransferase FadD29 
 EC 2.7.7.95: Now EC 6.2.1.49, long-chain fatty acid adenylyltransferase FadD28	 
 EC 2.7.7.96: ADP-D-ribose pyrophosphorylase	 
 EC 2.7.7.97: 3-hydroxy-4-methylanthranilate adenylyltransferase	 
 EC 2.7.7.98: Now EC 6.2.1.50, 4-hydroxybenzoate adenylyltransferase FadD22	 
 EC 2.7.7.99: N-acetyl-α-D-muramate 1-phosphate uridylyltransferase	 
 EC 2.7.7.100: SAMP-activating enzyme	 
 EC 2.7.7.101: DNA primase DnaG	 
 EC 2.7.7.102: DNA primase AEP	 
 EC 2.7.7.103: L-glutamine-phosphate cytidylyltransferase	 
 EC 2.7.7.104: 2-hydroxyethylphosphonate cytidylyltransferase	 
 EC 2.7.7.105: phosphoenolpyruvate guanylyltransferase	 
 EC 2.7.7.106: 3-phospho-D-glycerate guanylyltransferase

EC 2.7.8: Transferases for other substituted phosphate groups
 : diacylglycerol ethanolaminephosphotransferase
 : diacylglycerol cholinephosphotransferase
 : ceramide cholinephosphotransferase
 : serine ethanolaminephosphotransferase
 : CDP-diacylglycerol—glycerol-3-phosphate 1-phosphatidyltransferase
 : undecaprenyl-phosphate galactose phosphotransferase
 : holo-[acyl-carrier-protein] synthase
 : CDP-diacylglycerol—serine O-phosphatidyltransferase
 : phosphomannan mannosephosphotransferase
 : sphingosine cholinephosphotransferase
 : CDP-diacylglycerol—inositol 3-phosphatidyltransferase
 : CDP-glycerol glycerophosphotransferase
 : phospho-N-acetylmuramoyl-pentapeptide-transferase
 : CDP-ribitol ribitolphosphotransferase
 : UDP-N-acetylglucosamine—dolichyl-phosphate N-acetylglucosaminephosphotransferase
 EC 2.7.8.16: deleted, now included with EC 2.7.8.2 diacylglycerol cholinephosphotransferase
 : UDP-N-acetylglucosamine—lysosomal-enzyme N-acetylglucosaminephosphotransferase
 : UDP-galactose—UDP-N-acetylglucosamine galactose phosphotransferase
 : UDP-glucose—glycoprotein glucose phosphotransferase
 : phosphatidylglycerol—membrane-oligosaccharide glycerophosphotransferase
 : membrane-oligosaccharide glycerophosphotransferase
 : 1-alkenyl-2-acylglycerol choline phosphotransferase
 : carboxyvinyl-carboxyphosphonate phosphorylmutase
 : CDP-diacylglycerol—choline O-phosphatidyltransferase
 EC 2.7.8.25: Now EC 2.4.2.52, triphosphoribosyl-dephospho-CoA synthase
 : adenosylcobinamide-GDP ribazoletransferase
 : sphingomyelin synthase
 : 2-phospho-L-lactate transferase
 : L-serine-phosphatidylethanolamine phosphatidyltransferase
 EC 2.7.8.30: Now EC 2.4.2.53, undecaprenyl-phosphate 4-deoxy-4-formamido-L-arabinose transferase
 : undecaprenyl-phosphate glucose phosphotransferase
 : 3-O-α-D-mannopyranosyl-α-D-mannopyranose xylosylphosphotransferase
 : UDP-N-acetylglucosamine—undecaprenyl-phosphate N-acetylglucosaminephosphotransferase
 : CDP-L-myo-inositol myo-inositolphosphotransferase
 : UDP-N-acetylglucosamine—decaprenyl-phosphate N-acetylglucosaminephosphotransferase
 : undecaprenyl phosphate N,N′-diacetylbacillosamine 1-phosphate transferase
 : α-D-ribose 1-methylphosphonate 5-triphosphate synthase
 EC 2.7.8.39: archaetidylinositol phosphate synthase (*)	 
 EC 2.7.8.40: UDP-N-acetylgalactosamine-undecaprenyl-phosphate N-acetylgalactosaminephosphotransferase (*)	 
 EC 2.7.8.41: cardiolipin synthase (CMP-forming) (*)	 
 EC 2.7.8.42: Kdo2-lipid A phosphoethanolamine 7′′-transferase (*)	 
 EC 2.7.8.43: lipid A phosphoethanolamine transferase (*)	 
 EC 2.7.8.44: teichoic acid glycerol-phosphate primase (*)	 
 EC 2.7.8.45: teichoic acid glycerol-phosphate transferase (*)	 
 EC 2.7.8.46: teichoic acid ribitol-phosphate primase (*)	 
 EC 2.7.8.47: teichoic acid ribitol-phosphate polymerase (*)
(*) No Wikipedia article

EC 2.7.9: Phosphotransferases with paired acceptors (dikinases)
 : pyruvate, phosphate dikinase
 : pyruvate, water dikinase
 : selenide, water dikinase
 : α-glucan, water dikinase
 : phosphoglucan, water dikinase
 EC 2.7.9.6: rifampicin phosphotransferase (*)
(*) No Wikipedia article

EC 2.7.10: Protein-tyrosine kinases
 : receptor protein-tyrosine kinase
 : non-specific protein-tyrosine kinase

EC 2.7.11: Protein-serine/threonine kinases
 : non-specific serine/threonine protein kinase
 : [pyruvate dehydrogenase (acetyl-transferring)] kinase
 : dephospho-(reductase kinase) kinase
 : (3-methyl-2-oxobutanoate dehydrogenase (acetyl-transferring)) kinase
 : [isocitrate dehydrogenase (NADP+)] kinase
 : [tyrosine 3-monooxygenase] kinase
 : myosin-heavy-chain kinase
 : Fas-activated serine/threonine kinase
 : Goodpasture-antigen-binding protein kinase
 : IkB kinase
 : cAMP-dependent protein kinase
 : cGMP-dependent protein kinase
 : protein kinase C
 : rhodopsin kinase
 : β-adrenergic-receptor kinase
 : G-protein-coupled receptor kinase
 : Ca2+/calmodulin-dependent protein kinase
 : myosin-light-chain kinase
 : phosphorylase kinase
 : elongation factor 2 kinase
 : polo kinase
 : cyclin-dependent kinase
 : [RNA-polymerase]-subunit kinase
 : mitogen-activated protein kinase
 : mitogen-activated protein kinase kinase kinase
 : tau-protein kinase
 : [acetyl-CoA carboxylase] kinase
 : tropomyosin kinase
 : low-density-lipoprotein receptor kinase
 : receptor protein serine/threonine kinase
 : [hydroxymethylglutaryl-CoA reductase (NADPH)] kinase
 : [pyruvate, phosphate dikinase] kinase
 : [pyruvate, water dikinase] kinase

EC 2.7.12: Dual-specificity kinases (those acting on Ser/Thr and Tyr residues)
 : dual-specificity kinase
 : mitogen-activated protein kinase kinase

EC 2.7.13: Protein-histidine kinases
 : protein-histidine pros-kinase
 : protein-histidine tele-kinase
 : histidine kinase

EC 2.7.14: Protein-arginine kinases
EC 2.7.14.1: protein arginine kinase (*)
(*) No Wikipedia article

EC 2.7.99: Other protein kinases
 : triphosphate—protein phosphotransferase

EC 2.8: Transferring Sulfur-Containing Groups
EC 2.8.1: Sulfurtransferases
 : thiosulfate sulfurtransferase
 : 3-mercaptopyruvate sulfurtransferase
 : thiosulfate—thiol sulfurtransferase
 : tRNA sulfurtransferase
 : thiosulfate—dithiol sulfurtransferase
 : biotin synthase
 : cysteine desulfurase
 : lipoyl synthase
 : molybdenum cofactor sulfurtransferase
 : thiazole synthase
 : molybdopterin synthase sulfurtransferase
 : molybdopterin synthase
 EC 2.8.1.13: tRNA-uridine 2-sulfurtransferase (*)	 
 EC 2.8.1.14: tRNA-5-taurinomethyluridine 2-sulfurtransferase (*)	 
 EC 2.8.1.15: tRNA-5-methyluridine54 2-sulfurtransferase (*)	 
 EC 2.8.1.16: L-aspartate semialdehyde sulfurtransferase (*)	 
(*) No Wikipedia article

EC 2.8.2: Sulfotransferases
 : aryl sulfotransferase
 : alcohol sulfotransferase
 : amine sulfotransferase
 : estrone sulfotransferase
 : chondroitin 4-sulfotransferase
 : choline sulfotransferase
 : UDP-N-acetylgalactosamine-4-sulfate sulfotransferase
 : [heparan sulfate]-glucosamine N-sulfotransferase
 : tyrosine-ester sulfotransferase
 : Renilla-luciferin sulfotransferase
 : galactosylceramide sulfotransferase
 EC 2.8.2.12: deleted, identical to EC 2.8.2.8, [heparan sulfate]-glucosamine N-sulfotransferase
 : psychosine sulfotransferase
 : bile salt sulfotransferase
 : steroid sulfotransferase
 : thiol sulfotransferase
 : chondroitin 6-sulfotransferase
 : cortisol sulfotransferase
 : triglucosylalkylacylglycerol sulfotransferase
 : protein-tyrosine sulfotransferase
 : keratan sulfotransferase
 : aryl-sulfate sulfotransferase
 : [heparan sulfate]-glucosamine 3-sulfotransferase 1
 : desulfoglucosinolate sulfotransferase
 : flavonol 3-sulfotransferase
 : quercetin-3-sulfate 3′-sulfotransferase
 : quercetin-3-sulfate 4′-sulfotransferase
 : quercetin-3,3′-bissulfate 7-sulfotransferas
 : [heparan sulfate]-glucosamine 3-sulfotransferase 2
 : [heparan sulfate]-glucosamine 3-sulfotransferase 3
 : petromyzonol sulfotransferase
 : scymnol sulfotransferase
 : N-acetylgalactosamine 4-sulfate 6-O-sulfotransferase
 : glycochenodeoxycholate sulfotransferase
 : dermatan 4-sulfotransferase
 EC 2.8.2.36: desulfo-A47934 sulfotransferase (*)	 
 EC 2.8.2.37: trehalose 2-sulfotransferase (*)	 
 EC 2.8.2.38: aliphatic desulfoglucosinolate sulfotransferase (*)	 
 EC 2.8.2.39: hydroxyjasmonate sulfotransferase (*)	 
 EC 2.8.2.40: ω-hydroxy-β-dihydromenaquinone-9 sulfotransferase (*)	
(*) No Wikipedia article

EC 2.8.3: CoA-transferases
 : propionate CoA-transferase
 : oxalate CoA-transferase
 : malonate CoA-transferase
 : deleted
 : 3-oxoacid CoA-transferase
 : 3-oxoadipate CoA-transferase
 : succinate—citramalate CoA-transferase
 : acetate CoA-transferase
 : butyrate—acetoacetate CoA-transferase
 : citrate CoA-transferase
 : citramalate CoA-transferase
 : glutaconate CoA-transferase
 : succinate—hydroxymethylglutarate CoA-transferase
 : 5-hydroxypentanoate CoA-transferase
 : succinyl-CoA:(R)-benzylsuccinate CoA-transferase
 : formyl-CoA transferase
 : cinnamoyl-CoA:phenyllactate CoA-transferase

EC 2.8.3: CoA-transferases
 : propionate CoA-transferase
 : oxalate CoA-transferase
 : malonate CoA-transferase
 EC 2.8.3.4: deleted
 : 3-oxoacid CoA-transferase
 : 3-oxoadipate CoA-transferase
 EC 2.8.3.7: The activity is due to two enzymes, EC 2.8.3.22, succinyl-CoA—L-malate CoA-transferase and EC 2.8.3.20, succinyl-CoA—Dcitramalate CoA-transferase
 : acetate CoA-transferase
 : butyrate—acetoacetate CoA-transferase
 : citrate CoA-transferase
 : citramalate CoA-transferase
 : glutaconate CoA-transferase
 : succinate—hydroxymethylglutarate CoA-transferase
 : 5-hydroxypentanoate CoA-transferase
 : succinyl-CoA:(R)-benzylsuccinate CoA-transferase
 : formyl-CoA transferase
 : cinnamoyl-CoA:phenyllactate CoA-transferase
 EC 2.8.3.18: succinyl-CoA:acetate CoA-transferase (*)	 
 EC 2.8.3.19: CoA:oxalate CoA-transferase (*)	 
 EC 2.8.3.20: succinyl-CoA—D-citramalate CoA-transferase (*)	 
 EC 2.8.3.21: L-carnitine CoA-transferase (*)	 
 EC 2.8.3.22: succinyl-CoA—L-malate CoA-transferase (*)	 
 EC 2.8.3.23: caffeate CoA-transferase (*)	 
 EC 2.8.3.24: (R)-2-hydroxy-4-methylpentanoate CoA-transferase (*)	 
 EC 2.8.3.25: bile acid CoA-transferase (*)	 
 EC 2.8.3.26: succinyl-CoA:mesaconate CoA transferase (*)	 
(*) No Wikipedia article

EC 2.8.4: Transferring alkylthio groups
 : coenzyme-B sulfoethylthiotransferase
 : arsenate-mycothiol transferase
 EC 2.8.4.3:  tRNA-2-methylthio-N6-dimethylallyladenosine synthase (*)	 
 EC 2.8.4.4:  [ribosomal protein S12] (aspartate89-C3)-methylthiotransferase (*)	 
 EC 2.8.4.5:  tRNA (N6-L-threonylcarbamoyladenosine37-C2)-methylthiotransferase (*)	 
(*) No Wikipedia article

EC 2.8.5: Thiosulfotransferases
 EC 2.8.5.1: S-sulfo-L-cysteine synthase (3-phospho-L-serine-dependent) (*)
 EC 2.8.5.2: L-cysteine S''-thiosulfotransferase (*)
(*) No Wikipedia article

EC 2.9: Transferring Selenium-Containing Groups

EC 2.9.1: Selenotransferases
 : L-seryl-tRNASec selenium transferase
 : O-phospho-L-seryl-tRNASec:L-selenocysteinyl-tRNA synthase
 EC 2.9.1.3: tRNA 2-selenouridine synthase (*)
(*) No Wikipedia article

EC 2.10: Transferring molybdenum- or tungsten-containing groups

EC 2.10.1: Molybdenumtransferases or tungstentransferases with sulfide groups as acceptors 
 : molybdopterin molybdotransferase

References

EC2